Mikkel Desler Puggaard (born 19 February 1995) is a Danish professional footballer who plays as a midfielder for  club Toulouse.

Club career

OB
In February 2014, Desler attracted interest from several clubs, among others Parma and Roma. At the time, he was compared to former Roma player Daniele De Rossi.

On 8 May 2014, Desler got his debut for OB, replacing Mustafa Abdellaoue in the 73rd minute in a 2–1 victory against Randers FC in the Danish Superliga.

At the age of 19, Desler was promoted into the first team squad in the summer 2014 and also signed a new three-year contract with OB, after an impressive performance on a training camp with the first team in the winter 2014.

Haugesund
On 19 March 2019, Desler signed with Norwegian Eliteserien side Haugesund.

Toulouse 
Desler joined French side Toulouse in 2021. He helped the club win the 2021–22 Ligue 2, and finished in the league's Team of the Year.

Honours 
Toulouse
 Ligue 2: 2021–22

Individual
UNFP Ligue 2 Team of the Year: 2021–22

References

External links
 Mikkel Desler on OB website
 
 
 

1995 births
Living people
Danish men's footballers
Association football midfielders
Denmark youth international footballers
Denmark under-21 international footballers
Danish Superliga players
Eliteserien players
Ligue 1 players
Ligue 2 players
Odense Boldklub players
FK Haugesund players
Toulouse FC players
Puggaard family
Footballers at the 2016 Summer Olympics
Olympic footballers of Denmark
Danish expatriate men's footballers
Danish expatriate sportspeople in France
Expatriate footballers in France
Danish expatriate sportspeople in Norway
Expatriate footballers in Norway